Samuel Pierce Daly (born March 24, 1984) is an American actor. He is the son of actor Tim Daly and actress Amy Van Nostrand, and grandson of actor James Daly. His aunt is actress Tyne Daly. Daly attended Moses Brown School where he started to study acting. He is a 2006 graduate of Middlebury College, where he majored in Film and Media Studies and captained the basketball team his senior year. In a loss to Trinity College, Daly led his team in scoring with 18 points, all 3-pointers.

Filmography

Feature films

Television

References

External links

1984 births
Living people
American male film actors
American male television actors
Middlebury College alumni
Moses Brown School alumni
Actors from Providence, Rhode Island
Male actors from Rhode Island
21st-century American male actors